Simone Valère (2 August 1923 – 11 November 2010) was a French actress. She appeared in more than forty films from 1941 to 1993.

Filmography

External links 
 

1923 births
2010 deaths
Actresses from Paris
French film actresses
20th-century French actresses